Sycomacophila is an Afrotropical genus of gall wasps that live on the monoecious fig subgenus, Sycomorus.

Species
The described species include:
Sycomacophila carolae Rasplus, 2003
Sycomacophila gibernaui Rasplus, 2003
Sycomacophila montana Rasplus, 2003

References

External links 

Pteromalidae